A Village Scandal is a 1915 American short comedy film directed by and starring Fatty Arbuckle.

Cast
 Raymond Hitchcock
 Roscoe 'Fatty' Arbuckle as Fatty
 Flora Zabelle
 Al St. John
 Harry McCoy
 Minta Durfee

See also
 Fatty Arbuckle filmography

References

External links

1915 films
1915 comedy films
1915 short films
Films directed by Roscoe Arbuckle
American silent short films
American black-and-white films
Silent American comedy films
American comedy short films
1910s American films